Rikhi Ram Kaundal is a leader of Bharatiya Janata Party from Himachal Pradesh. He is a member of the Himachal Pradesh Legislative Assembly. Kaundal twice served as deputy speaker of the assembly during 1990-92 and 2009-12 .

References

Living people
1947 births
Deputy Speakers of the Himachal Pradesh Legislative Assembly
People from Bilaspur district, Himachal Pradesh
Himachal Pradesh MLAs 2012–2017
Bharatiya Janata Party politicians from Himachal Pradesh
Himachal Pradesh MLAs 1990–1992
Himachal Pradesh MLAs 2007–2012